Uranophora chalybea is a moth of the subfamily Arctiinae. It was described by Jacob Hübner in 1831. It is found on Cuba and Jamaica.

Adults are brilliant metallic blue.

References

Moths described in 1831
Euchromiina